The Treaty of Easton was a colonial agreement in North America signed in October 1758 during the French and Indian War (Seven Years' War) between British colonials and the chiefs of 13 Native American nations, representing tribes of the Iroquois, Lenape (Delaware), and Shawnee.  Negotiations over more than a week were concluded on October 26, 1758, at a ceremony held in Easton, Pennsylvania between the British colonial governors of the provinces of Pennsylvania and New Jersey, and representatives of 13 Indian nations, including the Iroquois, who sent chiefs of three of their nations to ensure their continued domination of their Ohio Country region; the eastern and western Lenape (Delaware), represented by two chiefs and headmen; Shawnee and others. More than 500 Native Americans attended the outdoor ceremony, after lengthy negotiations to bring peace to the regions of Pennsylvania, New Jersey and the Ohio Country.

Conrad Weiser served as an interpreter and arbitrator for the British colonial governments. Charles Thomson served as secretary and advisor to Teedyuscung, who was referred to as King of the Delawares.  The negotiations were held to hopefully resolve conflicts created by The Walking Purchase of 1737, which had lasting effects on the relationships between the Native Americans and the colonists. Attorney General of Pennsylvania, Benjamin Chew, Esq. attended the negotiations of the Treaty of Easton and documented the proceedings in his Journal of a Journey to Easton.  Charles Thomson also wrote about the Easton treaty negotiations in 1759 in a work entitled An Enquiry into the Causes of the Alienation of the Delaware and Shawanese Indians from the British Interest, which blamed the war on the proprietors (i.e. the sons of William Penn).  

The treaty specified that the Native American nations would not fight on the side of the French against the British in the current war.  In return, Pennsylvania returned large blocks of land which the Iroquois had ceded a few years before; the British colonial governors promised to recognize Iroquois and other tribes' rights to their hunting grounds in the Ohio River valley; and to refrain from establishing colonial settlements west of the Allegheny Mountains after the conclusion of the war. This clause of the treaty contributed to the Crown's subsequent Proclamation of 1763, by which it attempted to reserve territory west of the Appalachians for Native Americans and prohibit European-American advancement into the area. In addition, colonial governor William Denny of Pennsylvania agreed to negotiate directly with the Lenape-Delaware again without Iroquois intervention and marked the agreement by rekindling a "council fire." The conference concluded on October 26, 1758 and in November, Governor Denny announced to the Pennsylvania Assembly that "a general peace was secured at Easton."

By the treaty, the Lenape ceded all remaining claims to land within the Province of New Jersey for the sum of one thousand Spanish dollars.  They received payment immediately.

See also
List of treaties

Notes

External links
Chew Family Papers The Historical Society of Pennsylvania possesses the documents pertaining to the Journal of a Journey of Easton.

1758 treaties
1758 in the Thirteen Colonies
Easton
Easton
French and Indian War
Pre-statehood history of Pennsylvania
Native American history of New Jersey
Iroquois
Lenape
Northampton County, Pennsylvania
Shawnee history